Willis Feasey (born 28 August 1992) is a New Zealand alpine ski racer.
He competed at the 2013 World Championships in Schladming, AUT, in the downhill.

He competed at the 2015 World Championships in Beaver Creek, USA, in the downhill.

He competed at the 2017 World Championships in St Moritz, SUI, in the Super G.

He competed at the 2019 World Championships in Åre, Sweden., SWE, in the Giant Slalom.
He Competed in the 2018 Winter Olympics in Pyeongchang In Super G, Giant Slalom and Slalom

References

External links

1992 births
New Zealand male alpine skiers
Living people
Alpine skiers at the 2018 Winter Olympics
Olympic alpine skiers of New Zealand
Sportspeople from Christchurch